Men's field hockey at the 2006 Commonwealth Games took place between 17 March and 25 March. The competition consisted of a round robin stage of two groups of five with the winners and runners-up of each group qualifying for the semifinals. All matches were played at the State Netball and Hockey Centre in the Parkville area of Melbourne.

The competition was won by Australia who defeated Pakistan 3–0 to claim their third successive commonwealth title.

Squads

Results

Preliminary round

Pool A

Pool B

Classification matches

Ninth and tenth place

Seventh and eighth place

Fifth and sixth place

Medal round

Semi-finals

Bronze medal match

Gold medal match

Final standings

Goalscorers

References

Men's tournament